Admiral Sir John Arthur Symons Eccles,  (20 June 1898 – 1 March 1966) was a Royal Navy officer who served as Commander-in-Chief, Home Fleet from 1955 until his retirement in 1958.

Naval career
Eccles joined the Royal Navy in 1916 during the First World War.

Eccles then became Commander of the Royal Navy Barracks at Chatham in 1948. He was appointed Flag Officer commanding the Australian Fleet in 1949 and Admiral commanding the Reserves in 1952. He went on to be Flag Officer Air (Home) in 1953 and Commander-in-Chief, Home Fleet and NATO Allied Commander-in-Chief Eastern Fleet in 1955 before retiring in 1958.

References

|-

1898 births
1966 deaths
Commanders of the Order of the British Empire
Knights Grand Cross of the Order of the Bath
Knights Commander of the Royal Victorian Order
Royal Navy admirals
Military personnel from London
Royal Navy personnel of World War I
Royal Navy officers of World War II